Itacuphocera is a genus of parasitic flies in the family Tachinidae. There are at least three described species in Itacuphocera.

Species
These three species belong to the genus Itacuphocera:
 Itacuphocera borgmeieri Guimaraes, 1964
 Itacuphocera carrerai Guimaraes, 1964
 Itacuphocera ocellaris Townsend, 1927

References

Further reading

 
 
 
 

Tachinidae
Articles created by Qbugbot